The Silver City North Addition Historic District is a residential historic district in Silver City, New Mexico. The district includes several blocks on the north side of College Avenue; the area between West and Santa Rita Streets is especially significant. The North Addition was a well-to-do neighborhood of Silver City in the late 1800s and early 1900s, and some of the city's most prominent residents lived there. Local politicians, attorneys, builders, doctors, and three presidents of Western New Mexico University owned homes in the neighborhood. The Queen Anne style, which was popular nationally during the district's development, predominates in the district. Many of the houses feature vernacular forms, such as the hipped box plan, with Queen Anne elements such as window detailing and frame porches. The district also includes several bungalows built in the 20th century.

The district was added to the National Register of Historic Places on February 17, 1983.

See also

National Register of Historic Places listings in Grant County, New Mexico

References

Queen Anne architecture in New Mexico
Historic districts on the National Register of Historic Places in New Mexico
National Register of Historic Places in Grant County, New Mexico